Stephen Barlow (June 13, 1779 – August 24, 1845) was a Jacksonian member of the U.S. House of Representatives from Pennsylvania.

Biography
Stephen Barlow was born in Redding, Connecticut.  He attended the common schools and Yale College.  He moved to Meadville, Pennsylvania, in 1816, studied law, was admitted to the bar and commenced practice in Meadville.

Barlow was elected as a Jacksonian to the Twentieth Congress.  He was an unsuccessful candidate for reelection in 1828 to the Twenty-first Congress.  He resumed the practice of his profession and served in the Pennsylvania House of Representatives from 1829 to 1831.  He was appointed as an associate judge of Crawford County, Pennsylvania, in January 1831 and served until his death in Meadville in 1845.  Interment in Greendale Cemetery.

Sources

The Political Graveyard

External links

1779 births
1845 deaths
Members of the Pennsylvania House of Representatives
Yale College alumni
Pennsylvania state court judges
Pennsylvania lawyers
Jacksonian members of the United States House of Representatives from Pennsylvania
19th-century American politicians
Burials at Greendale Cemetery